Eduard Michael Johann Maria Freiherr von der Ropp (1851–1939) was a Polish nobleman of Baltic German origins and Roman Catholic metropolitan archbishop.  He was born 14 December 1851 near Līksna in present-day Latvia and died on 25 July 1939 in Poznań, Poland.

Early life
Eduard von der Ropp was the third of four sons of Emmerich Julius Freiherr von der Ropp and Izabela Józefa Plater-Zyberk, daughter of civil vicegovernor of Vilnius Michał Plater-Zyberk.  His father was a direct descendant of Theodoricus de Raupena, the eldest brother of Bishop Albert who founded the city of Riga in 1201.  His mother's family had estates at both Lixna (Līksna) in Latgale (then Vitebsk Governorate) and Bewern (Bebrene) in Sēlija (then Courland Governorate) .

He received his university education in Saint Petersburg and graduated in 1875.  After graduation he remained in Saint Petersburg working for the Russian government.  In 1886, he decided to enter the Roman Catholic seminary in Kaunas. In 1889 he was ordained priest for the diocese of Samogitia.

After ordination, von der Ropp was sent to Liepāja in Courland where he worked as a parish priest for 13 years. There he began enlargement of a small church building into what is now the Cathedral of St. Joseph.  In 1893 he was given additional responsibility as the vicar of all parishes in Courland.

Episcopal ministry

Von der Ropp was appointed bishop of Tiraspol in southern Russia on 9 June 1902 by Pope Leo XIII. He was ordained bishop in Saratov on 16 November 1902.

Only a year later on 9 November 1903 he was appointed bishop of Vilnius by Pope Pius X. On 2 December 1903, von der Ropp was installed in Vilnius Cathedral.  He traveled back to Saratov in 1904 to co-consecrate his successor as bishop of Tiraspol Josef Alois Kessler on 10 November.

After the 1905 revolution, von der Ropp was elected to the first Duma. In 1907 he was exiled to Tbilisi in the Caucasus by the Imperial Russian Government.

On 25 July 1917, he was appointed metropolitan archbishop of Mohilev by Pope Benedict XV. He returned to Saint Petersburg to take up this post, but quickly came into conflict with the new Soviet government. He received a death sentence for anti-Soviet agitation in 1919, but instead was deported to the Second Polish Republic in 1920 on the intercession of the Holy See. Pope Pius XI appointed him an assistant at the Pontifical Throne on 28 May 1927.

Unable to return to Russia, he lived in Poland with one of his nephews until his death in 1939. He traveled to Latvia in 1924 to attend the ingress of Archbishop Antonijs Springovičs at the Cathedral of St. James in Riga on 4 May and to co-consecrate the new auxiliary bishop of Riga Jāzeps Rancāns the same day. Von der Ropp is buried in the Archcathedral Basilica of St. Peter and St. Paul, Poznań.

See also
 Jan Cieplak
 Lithuanian and Belorussian Constitutional Catholic Party
 Vatican and Eastern Europe (1846–1958)

References

Bibliography
  "Ropp", Neue Deutsche Biographie, Duncker & Humblot GmbH, Berlin (2005), vol. 22, pp. 33–35, 
  "Rosen", Neue Deutsche Biographie, Duncker & Humblot GmbH, Berlin (2005), vol. 22, pp. 49–50,

External links
  Archbishop Eduard Baron von der Ropp
  Eduard Baron von der Ropp
  Emmerich Julius Baron von der Ropp

1851 births
1939 deaths
People from Augšdaugava Municipality
People from Dvinsky Uyezd
Baltic-German people
Barons of Germany
Barons of Poland
Latvian Roman Catholic bishops
Bishops of Vilnius
Members of the 1st State Duma of the Russian Empire
Roman Catholic bishops in the Soviet Union
20th-century Roman Catholic bishops in Lithuania
20th-century Roman Catholic bishops in the Russian Empire
Anti-communists from the Russian Empire
Roman Catholic activists